Senator Connors may refer to:

Albert J. Connors (1891–1948), Wisconsin State Senate
Christopher J. Connors (born 1956), New Jersey State Senate
Leonard T. Connors (1929–2016), New Jersey State Senate
William J. Connors (1891–1961), Illinois State Senate

See also
Senator Connor (disambiguation)